Jerdon's baril (Barilius canarensis) is a fish in the genus Barilius of the family Cyprinidae. It is found in southern Karnataka and northern Kerala.

References

C
Fish of India
Fish described in 1849